Mathures Paul  is a journalist for The Telegraph newspaper in Calcutta, India. His articles cover a wide range of subjects, including: films, music and information & technology. He was previously with The Statesman.

Some of the people he has interviewed include Astad Deboo, Indian filmmaker Dibakar Banerjee, noted bassist Victor Wooten and electronica group Midival Punditz.
His list of articles on important singers who are now more or less forgotten include Tony Brent, Kal Kahn  and Miss X

References

External links 
 The Statesman
 The Telegraph (Calcutta)

Living people
Indian newspaper journalists
1978 births
Journalists from West Bengal
Writers from Kolkata